Dimitris "Takis" Karagiozopoulos (born 4 February 1961) is a Greek former professional footballer who played as defender, mostly for AEK Athens. He is famous and beloved to AEK fans for his 12-year presence and for scoring the historic "golden" goal against Olympiacos on 7 May 1989, giving the Championship to AEK after 10 whole years.

Club career
Karagiozopoulos started playing football for Filippos Melikis and in 1978 he was transferred to Veria, where he played in the position of striker. In 1981 he signed for AEK Athens, playing in the attack for the first two years, until the then coach of AEK, the late Zlatko Čajkovski converted him to the position of defender, after his serious injury Petros Ravousis. Together with Stelios Manolas made an excellent defending duo. He played with AEK for twelve years, winning three Championships a Cup, a Super Cup and a League Cup. He was a footballer who was distinguished for his intelligence, composure in his game, his very good technique for a defensive player, while he was also a specialist in penalty kicks. He never belonged to the "stars" of AEK, but he was a very useful "tool" for the team for twelve whole years, while he was at times one of its leaders. He had a total 231 appearances in league games with 19 goals, 47 cup games with six goals and 11 appearances in Europe. In 1993 he left AEK and transferred to Apollon Athens where he ended his career.

The golden goal
It was May 7, 1989 when AEK played one of the most important games in their history, in an away match against Olympiacos at the Olympic Stadium, for the penultimate game of the 1988–89 season. AEK had the opportunity with a victory or a draw to win the championship after 10 rough years. On the other hand, Olympiacos had a huge budget and although they only wanted a victory, were considered to be the favorite, since they were in excellent condition and played at home. Olympiacos entered the game dynamically, put a lot of pressure on AEK and lost several chances. As time passed, the pressure of the "red and whites" increased, but the goalpost of Ikonomopoulos stayed in tact. At the 83rd minute, when AEK counterattacked Karagiozopoulos, who entered the game as a sub, combined 2 times with Okoński, starting from the area of AEK to the area of Olympiacos. Finally, he dribbled Alexiou, shoot with his left foot and sent the ball into the net and the fans of AEK in "heaven". This was one of the most important goals in the history of AEK as the 0-1 remained until the end and found the "yellow-blacks" Champions. Never before has an AEK player been so closely associated with achieving a specific goal. Regardless of the rest of his career in the team, Karagiozopoulos is one of the most beloved players of all time to the friends of AEK, only thanks to that "golden" goal.

International career
Karagiozopoulos played in the Greece's youth team in 1978. He played in the Greek mediterranean team in 1979, at Split and in 1987 in Latakia. In 1983 he played with  U21 team against Denmark. He was also a member of the team that played in the 1984 pre-Olympic tournament.

Coaching career
After the end of his career, Karagiozopoulos was initially involved in coaching and was on the bench of the AEK Athens, as an assistant coach for the two years. He even had to serve as the first head coach for some matches. For the 1998-99 season, between the dismissal of Dragoslav Stepanović and the hiring of Oleg Blokhin, he was the coach of the team for three league matches, while he was also on the bench as the first coach in the tragic exclusion from Poseidon Michanionas for the cup. For the 1999-00 season, he replaced Ljubiša Tumbaković for a match.

Later Karagiozopoulos dealt with the science he has studied as a professor of physical education, while he deals with coaching only on an amateur level. The years after the end of his playing career until today, has a very active participation in the association of veteran football players of AEK.

Stats

Honours

AEK Athens 
Alpha Ethniki: 1988–89, 1991–92, 1992–93
Greek Cup:1982–83
Greek Super Cup: 1989
Greek League Cup: 1990

References

1961 births
Living people
Greek footballers
Super League Greece players
Veria F.C. players
AEK Athens F.C. players
Apollon Smyrnis F.C. players
Association football defenders
AEK Athens F.C. managers
Greek football managers
People from Imathia
Footballers from Central Macedonia